Ousmane Biébli Siry (born 30 May 1991) is a Burkinabé international footballer who plays for Rahimo FC, as a midfielder.

Career
He has played club football for Rahimo FC.

He made his international debut for Burkina Faso in 2018.

References

1991 births
Living people
Burkinabé footballers
Burkina Faso international footballers
Rahimo FC players
Association football midfielders
21st-century Burkinabé people
Burkina Faso A' international footballers
2018 African Nations Championship players